Bloodbeat (also spelled Blood Beat) is a 1982 supernatural slasher film written and directed by Fabrice-Ange Zaphiratos and starring Helen Benton, Terry Brown, Claudia Peyton, James Fitzgibbons, and Dana Day. The plot focuses on a young couple attending a family gathering for Christmas in a rural home when a spirit wearing samurai armor begins killing members of the family—two of whom have psychic abilities—and their neighbors.

The film is an international co-production of the United States and France, and was shot in Wisconsin. In October 2017, it was restored and released on DVD and Blu-ray by Vinegar Syndrome.

Plot
Sarah accompanies her new boyfriend, Ted, at his family's farmhouse in rural Wisconsin for Christmas. Ted's artist mother, Cathy, immediately senses a psychic connection with Sarah that she cannot explain, which perturbs Sarah. Sarah goes with Ted, his mother's boyfriend Gary, his sister Dolly, and his uncle Peter, on a hunting excursion in the woods. Sarah becomes upset when they prepare to shoot a deer, and flees into the woods. While running through a grove of trees, Sarah is confronted by a man who has been eviscerated, and who grabs onto her before dying. Police and paramedics arrive to recover the body of the man, whom none of them can identify.

Disturbed by the incident, Sarah goes to bed early. Cathy tells Ted that she has seen Sarah before in visions. Late that night, Sarah opens a trunk to find samurai armor and a sword; Ted and Cathy find her awake in her bedroom, and assure her that the experience was a dream. Sarah, unable to sleep, momentarily joins the rest of the family in the living room. Peter drives to town, but his truck crashes. He is approached by a figure, and his throat is slashed.

Meanwhile, the family's next-door neighbors Paul and Christie are attacked by a ghostly samurai armed with a sword inside their home, while Sarah levitates in her bed. Christie is impaled in the kitchen, and Paul escapes in his van upon finding her body. When his van breaks down, Paul flees on foot back to Cathy's house, pursued by the samurai. At the front door, the family find Paul's bloodied body. Soon, the house becomes subject to violent poltergeist activity. The telephone melts, and Gary is rendered unconscious when various kitchen utensils and items are hurled at him.

Ted and Dolly rush upstairs to retrieve Sarah, and find the hall illuminated by a pulsing blue light. Ted and Dolly are then locked in a closet. Downstairs, Cathy attempts to communicate with the spirit attacking the house, while the home's lights and appliances surge wildly. After some time, the paranormal activity ceases, and Dolly and Ted are freed from the closet, while Gary regains consciousness. Outside, the samurai attacks and kills three men by a campfire. Meanwhile, in the house, Ted and Sarah have sex.

At dawn, Dolly goes to search for Ted, who has disappeared into the woods, and is attacked by the samurai. Gary and Ted both hear her screams, and Gary saves her by bludgeoning the samurai with an axe. Gary returns home with the samurai's armor, which Cathy and Dolly urge him to burn, but he refuses, telling them he must turn it into police. Moments later, Ted finds Sarah burning a photo in her bedroom with pyrokinesis, and she throws him across the room using telekinetic powers. Cathy confronts Sarah, who she finds adorning herself in the samurai armor, and realizes that Sarah is a reincarnation of the warrior. Cathy attempts to overpower Sarah with her psychic ability, but Sarah stabs both her and Gary to death. Ted and Dolly enter the room, manifest their psychic abilities and together manage to defeat Sarah before leaving the house.

Cast

Production

Bloodbeat was filmed in Wisconsin on 35 mm. The director of photography, Wladimir Maule, believed that the film was being shot for television rather than for theaters, and filmed in fullscreen rather than widescreen. Writer-director Fabrice-Ange Zaphiratos was under the influence of drugs during at least some of the writing process and the filming; he has stated that the film's title, Bloodbeat, is a reference to the accelerated heartbeat experienced while high.

Reception
Writer John Stanley stated that "Fabrice-Ange Zaphiratos deserves a nod for making a gore film in which he blends psychic and slasher genres", though he noted that the gore elements are "minimal", as the film instead "goes for weirdness through music (some of it classical), enigmatic characters and a sexual link between the sister and the spectral samurai."

Michael Gingold of Rue Morgue wrote that Bloodbeat is "essentially an 86-minute non sequitur, full of odd dialogue, random characters, sudden bursts of cheesy optical-effects lunacy, sex/death juxtapositions that never make sense [...] While the movie rarely has its desired effect, it does keep you watching, just to see what bit of nuttiness Zaphiratos will pull out of his hat next." Zachary Paul of Bloody Disgusting wrote that the plot of Bloodbeat is "esoteric at best", but that it "managed to cast a spell on me that had me mesmerized from beginning to end. Like a nice fluffy blanket on a chilly winter night, the film lulled me into its grasp with every illogical turn."

Rob Hunter of Film School Rejects wrote: "I'd be lying if I said I had a clue what the hell was going on plot-wise", but noted that "the movie manages some interesting visuals along its confusing journey." Brian Orndorf of Blu-ray.com wrote that the film "has the appearance of a campy good time with a bad, bad movie" but that "it becomes a chore to watch". He lamented that "there should be a lot more consistent craziness when dealing with a film that pits a ghost samurai against an amateur painter."

Home media
By 1985, Bloodbeat was released on VHS by Trans World Entertainment. On October 24, 2017, the film was released on DVD and Blu-ray by Vinegar Syndrome, featuring a 4K restoration of the film taken from a 35 mm print that suffered from mold and moisture damage. The Vinegar Syndrome release also includes a commentary track by Fabrice-Ange Zaphiratos, as well as interviews with Zaphiratos and Maule. As of December 2019, the film is available for streaming on Amazon Prime Video.

References

External links
 

1982 horror films
1980s Christmas horror films
1980s slasher films
American Christmas horror films
American slasher films
American supernatural horror films
Films shot in Wisconsin
Films about psychic powers
French Christmas horror films
French slasher films
French supernatural horror films
Samurai films
Supernatural slasher films
1980s English-language films
1980s American films
1980s Japanese films
1980s French films